Cool Hands is an album by jazz percussionist Buck Clarke. It was recorded in Washington D.C. on December 2–3, 1959, and released by Washington Records. It features Charles Hampton, Don McKenzie, Fred Williams and Roscoe Hunter.

Reception 

AllMusic rated the album 3 stars.

Track listing 
 "Cool Hands" (Charles Hampton) – 3:47
 "What Is This Thing Called Love?" (Cole Porter) – 5:28
 "Second Wind" (Fred Williams) – 4:16
 "Mil-dy" (Charles Hampton) – 3:16
 "Ed's Blues" (Charles Hampton) – 5:36
 "X-a-dose" (Clark, McKenzie, Hampton, Williams, Hunter) – 6:08
 "Lover Man" (Roger Ramirez, James Sherman, Jimmy Davis) – 4:37
 "I'll Remember April" (Don Raye, Gene de Paul, Patricia Johnston) – 5:03
 "Floretta" (Don MacKenzie) – 7:03

Source:

Personnel 
Buck Clarke – congas, bongos
Charles Hampton – clarinet, alto saxophone, wood flute, piano
Don McKenzie – vibes
Fred Williams – bass
Roscoe Hunter – drums

Source:

References

External links
Discussion at organissimo.org

Buck Clarke albums
1960 albums